Guillemets (also ,) are a pair of punctuation marks in the form of sideways double chevrons,  and , used as quotation marks in a number of languages. Guillemets are not conventionally used in the English language.

Terminology 
Guillemets may also be called angle, Latin, Castilian, Spanish,  or French quotes / quotation marks.

Guillemet is a diminutive of the French name , apparently after the French printer and punchcutter Guillaume Le Bé (1525–1598), though he did not invent the symbols: they first appear in a 1527 book printed by Josse Bade. Some languages derive their word for guillemets analogously: 

Adobe acknowledges the error.

Shape 

Guillemets are smaller than less-than and greater-than signs, which in turn are smaller than angle brackets.

Uses

As quotation marks 

Guillemets are used pointing outwards («like this») to indicate speech in these languages and regions:
 Albanian
 Arabic
 Armenian
 Belarusian
 Breton
 Bulgarian (rarely used; „...“ is official)
 Catalan
 Chinese (《 and 》 are used to indicate a book or album title)
 Esperanto (usage varies)
 Estonian (marked usage; „...“ prevails)
 Franco-Provençal
 French (spaced out by thin spaces « like this », except in Switzerland)
 Galician
 Greek
 Italian
 Khmer
 Northern Korean (in Southern Korean, " is used)
 Kurdish
 Latvian (stūrainās pēdiņas)
 Norwegian
 Persian
 Portuguese (used mostly in European Portuguese, due to its presence in typical computer keyboards; considered obsolete in Brazilian Portuguese)
 Romanian; only to indicate a quotation within a quotation
 Russian, and some languages of the former Soviet Union using Cyrillic script („...“ is also used for nested quotes and in hand-written text.)
 Spanish (uncommon in daily usage, but commonly used in publishing)
 Swiss languages
 Turkish (dated usage; almost entirely replaced with “...” by late 20th century)
 Uyghur
 Ukrainian
 Uzbek (mostly in the Cyrillic script)
Vietnamese (previously, now "..." is official)

Guillemets are used pointing inwards (»like this«) to indicate speech in these languages:
 Croatian (marked usage; „...” prevails)
 Czech (marked usage; „...“ prevails)
 Danish ("..." is also used)
 Esperanto (very uncommon)
 German (except in Switzerland; here guillemets are preferred for printed matters, whilst „...“ is preferred in handwriting)
 Hungarian (only used „inside a section »as a secondary quote« marked by the usual quotes” like this)
 Polish (used to indicate a quote inside a quote as defined by dictionaries; more common usage in practice. See also: Polish orthography)
 Serbian (marked usage; „...“ prevails)
 Slovak (marked usage; „...“ prevails)
 Slovene („...“ and "..." also used)
 Swedish (this style, and »...» are rarely used; ”...” is the common and correct form)

Guillemets are used pointing right (»like this») to indicate speech in these languages:
 Finnish (”...” is the common and correct form)
 Swedish (this style and «...» are rarely used; ”...” is the common and correct form)

Ditto mark

UML 
Guillemets are used in Unified Modeling Language to indicate a stereotype of a standard element.

Mail merge 
Microsoft Word uses guillemets when creating mail merges. Then on the final printout, the guillemet-marked tags are replaced by each instance of the corresponding data item intended for that field by the user.

Encoding 

Double guillemets are present in many 8-bit extended ASCII character sets. They were at 0xAE and 0xAF (174 and 175) in CP437 on the IBM PC, and 0xC7 and 0xC8 in Mac OS Roman, and placed in several of ISO 8859 code pages (namely: -1, -7, -8, -9, -13, -15, -16) at 0xAB and 0xBB (171 and 187).

Microsoft added the single guillemets to CP1252 and similar sets used in Windows at 0x8B and 0x9B (139 and 155) (where the ISO standard placed C1 control codes).

The ISO 8859 locations were inherited by Unicode, which added the single guillemets at new locations:

 
 
 
 

Despite their names, the characters are mirrored when used in right-to-left contexts.

Keyboard entry 
The double guillemets are standard keys on AZERTY and French Canadian QWERTY keyboards and some others.

See also 
 Chevron
 Keyboard (computing)
 Quotation mark

References

External links 

Punctuation
Typographical symbols